Nana Emeka Boakye-Yiadom (born 13 May 1996) is an English footballer who plays for Barking.

Club career
Boakye-Yiadom began his career with the West Ham United academy before appearing on trial at Barnsley's Under 18. Boakye-Yiadom signed a professional contract with Barnsley in May 2014. He made his Football League debut on 9 August 2014 in 78th minute of a 1–0 home defeat to Crawley Town, almost scoring when he glanced a header wide in stoppage time.

After making four appearances, Boakye-Yiadom was among seven players released by the club.

After a year without a club, Boakye-Yiadom joined Isthmian League Premier Division side Leatherhead in December 2016. On 1 January 2017, Boakye-Yiadom made his Leatherhead debut in 0–0 draw with Merstham, replacing Richard Seixas in the 54th minute. On 29 April 2017, Boakye-Yiadom scored twice for Waltham Forest in a 3–2 victory against Southend Manor.

Boakye-Yiadom rejoined Waltham Forest for the start of the 2017–18 season, scoring in their opening day Essex Senior League draw at Hullbridge Sports, before moving to Dulwich Hamlet for the start of the Isthmian League Premier season, scoring his first goals for the club with a hat-trick against Hastings United in a 3–1 FA Cup 1st Qualifying Round win on 2 September 2017.

On 31 March 2018, Boakye-Yiadom returned to Leatherhead on a loan deal until the end of the campaign.

On 11 May 2018, Boakye-Yiadom joined National League South side Concord Rangers on a one-year deal, reuniting with former manager, Sammy Moore. In September 2018, Boakye-Yiadom signed for AFC Hornchurch. In February 2019, after making 16 appearances for Hornchurch in all competitions, scoring three times, Boakye-Yiadom signed for Barking.

Personal life
Boakye-Yiadom was born in England and is of Ghanaian descent.

Career statistics

References

External links

1996 births
Living people
English footballers
English people of Ghanaian descent
Barnsley F.C. players
Leatherhead F.C. players
Waltham Forest F.C. players
Dulwich Hamlet F.C. players
Concord Rangers F.C. players
Hornchurch F.C. players
Barking F.C. players
English Football League players
Association football forwards
Isthmian League players